Warren is an unincorporated community in the remote north central region of the U.S. state of Idaho, near the Frank Church River of No Return Wilderness.

Geography

Climate
According to the Köppen climate classification system, Warren has a subarctic climate (Köppen Dfc).

History
Miners from the previous gold strikes in Pierce and Florence fanned out to the south and discovered gold in the Warren Creek area in August 1862. It led to the formation of the settlement, then in Washington Territory, making it one of the oldest settlements in present-day Idaho. With a gold mining boom in multiple regions during the Civil War, the Idaho Territory was established in 1863. Shortly after the gold discovery by Lewiston's James Warren, the Warren's Camp population swelled to over 2,000; the southerners called their area of the camp "Richmond" and northerners called theirs "Washington." Washington was established as the seat of Idaho County from June 1, 1869 until voters in the June 1875  election selected Mount Idaho over Slate Creek and Washington.

After the initial boom ended in 1875, Warren was known for its significant Chinese population.

The boom-town population plummeted when mining declined, but enjoyed a brief renaissance in the 1930s with the introduction of dredge mining in the area. During World War II, gold mining was shut down by the U.S. government in 1942. Following the war, interest in Warren was high for rare-earth metals in its by-product monazite. A modest gold mining industry remains in the area.

The town has been threatened several times by forest fires, most recently in 1989, 2000, and 2007. Recent fires have made the Warren area a haven for morel mushroom hunting.

Warren currently has a full-time population of 12 to 16.

Population history

 1864 census: 521 (509 men, 10 women, 2 children)
 1863 census: 660

References

Additional sources 
 A History of Warren, Idaho: Mining, Race, and Environment

External links
State of Idaho tourism site - Warren
AirNav.com - Warren USFS Airport
Weather.com - Warren, Idaho
Western Regional Climate Center - Warner, Idaho climate data

Unincorporated communities in Idaho
Unincorporated communities in Idaho County, Idaho